ROKS Mokpo (PCC-759) was a  of the Republic of Korea Navy.

Development and design 

The Pohang class is a series of corvettes built by different Korean shipbuilding companies. The class consists of 24 ships and some after decommissioning were sold or given to other countries. There are five different types of designs in the class from Flight II to Flight VI.

Construction and career 
Mokpo was launched on 12 October 1984 by DSME in Geoje. The vessel was commissioned on 17 May 1985 and decommissioned on 30 December 2014.

References
 

Ships built by Daewoo Shipbuilding & Marine Engineering
Pohang-class corvettes
1984 ships